Eucalyptus × missilis, commonly known as bullet bush, is a species of mallee that is endemic to a small area on the south coast of Western Australia. It has smooth bark, egg-shaped to lance-shaped adult leaves, flower buds in groups of between seven and fifteen, pale yellow flowers and cup-shaped to cylindrical fruit. It is thought to be a hybrid between E. cornuta and E. angulosa that occur in the same area.

Description
It has smooth dull grey bark. The characteristics of this mallee are intermediate between those of E. cornuta and E. angulosa but the authors, Ian Brooker and Stephen Hopper consider "that the morphological uniformity of mature individuals within and between all populations justifies taxonomic recognition of the species." It is usually found growing with both parent species.

Taxonomy and naming
Eucalyptus × missilis was first formally described in 2002 by Ian Brooker and Stephen Hopper in the journal Nuytsia from specimens collected from Cheyne Beach in 1983. The specific epithet (missilis) is a Latin word meaning "missile". The species is known as "bullet bush" because of the shaped of the flower buds.

Distribution and habitat
This mallee grows in sand over limestone or granite in coastal sites between West Cape Howe and Cape Le Grand.

Conservation status
This eucalypt is classified as "Priority Four" by the Government of Western Australia Department of Parks and Wildlife, meaning that is rare or near threatened.

See also
List of Eucalyptus species

References

missilis
Eucalypts of Western Australia
Myrtales of Australia
Plants described in 2002
Taxa named by Ian Brooker
Taxa named by Stephen Hopper
Plant nothospecies